Mete  is a common masculine Turkish given name. In Turkish, "Mete" means "brave", "galahad", "hero", "valiant", and/or "gallant".

Mete is a deformed version of "Mo - du" which is the regional name of Modu Chanyu who was the founder of Xiongnu Empire. Appropriate Turkish reading of "Mo - du" is "Baghatur". Baghatur is also used as a masculine given name by Turkish people as Bahadır, Batur, and as in other cognate forms.

Abbreviation
 MetE, Met.E., Metallurgical Engineer

People

Given name
 Ahmet Mete Işıkara (1941-2013), Turkish seismologist
 Mete Binay, Turkish weightlifter
 Mete Özgencil, Turkish singer
 Halil Mete Soner, Turkish mathematician

Surname
 Victor Mete (born 1998), Canadian ice hockey player

Fictional characters
 Mete Akarsu, in Öyle Bir Geçer Zaman ki (see Turkish Wikipedia article).

Turkish masculine given names